The Annie Award for Best Animated Television Production for Children is an Annie Award, awarded annually to the best animated television/broadcasting productions for children audiences. It was first given at the 31st Annie Awards.

The categories for television/broadcasting productions have gone through several name changes and divisions:
 From 1992 to 1997, there was only one award named Best Animated Television Program
 In 1998, the award was split into two categories, Outstanding Achievement in an Animated Daytime Television Program and Outstanding Achievement in an Animated Primetime or Late Night Television Program, but was eventually combined into one category again. 
 In 2001, the category Best Animated Television Production for Children was created, though it was not presented in a regular way until 2007.
 In 2011, the awards for television productions were split into their current division based on the audience of the program, establishing three categories, Best General Audience Animated Television Production, Best Animated Television Production for Children and Best Animated Television Production for Preschool.

Winners and nominees

2000s
Best Animated Television Production Produced for Children

Outstanding Achievement in an Animated Television Production Produced for Children

Best Animated Television Production for Children

2010s

2020s

See also
 Daytime Emmy Award for Outstanding Children's Animated Program

References

External links
 Annie Awards: Legacy

Annie Awards
American television awards